Half Way Tree is a neighbourhood in the city of Kingston, Jamaica. It is the parish capital of St. Andrew.

Half Way Tree is served by the Kingston 10 post office.

In recent years, as a result of crime and violence in Downtown Kingston and Cross Roads, Half Way Tree has overtaken these areas as the central hub of the capital, Kingston and, perhaps, the busiest thoroughfare in the city. The area has become a popular location to do business in Kingston because of its central location and close proximity to Downtown Kingston, the New Kingston Business District as well as it being the transportation of hub of Kingston. The National Works Agency, for example, estimates that approximately 250,000 commute through the Half Way Tree area on a daily basis from Monday through Saturdays. In recent years, the area has become increasingly attractive as a residential neighbourhood to young professionals, again because of its proximity to where many of them work. The apartments and townhouses are located mainly on Surbiton Road, Winchester Road, Ruthven Road and Cecelio Avenue. As a result, Half Way Tree has become one of the most expensive areas in Kingston to purchase real estate: an acre of land can run as high as US$1.5 million.

A number of prominent schools, including St Andrew High School for Girls and Holy Childhood High School, are located in the heart of Half Way Tree.

A busy shopping district, Half Way Tree is also home to the most well-known plazas and malls—such as Twin Gates, Mall Plaza, Tropical Plaza, Kings Plaza, Lane Plaza, the Pavilion Mall—in Kingston and Jamaica as a whole. There are also a number of prominent churches in the area such as Holy Cross Church and Webster Memorial.

While the business and commercial areas are in the heart of Half Way Tree, the residential areas tend to be concentrated on the outer verges.

Within a mile of the clock tower marking the position of the old Half Way Tree is Devon House, a National Heritage Site.

Notable people
May Farquharson, social worker, birth control advocate, philanthropist, and reformer
Hugh Verity, Royal Air Force pilot who flew secret agents in and out of France during World War II, was born here

References

Neighbourhoods in Kingston, Jamaica
Populated places in Saint Andrew Parish, Jamaica